Béla Ordódy (13 January 1880 – 28 November 1955) was a Hungarian football and ice hockey player. He played for the Hungarian national team at the 1928 Winter Olympics.

References

External links
 
 
 
 

1880 births
1955 deaths
Hungarian footballers
Hungarian ice hockey goaltenders
Hungary international footballers
Ice hockey players at the 1928 Winter Olympics
Olympic ice hockey players of Hungary
Association footballers not categorized by position
Footballers from Budapest